Gillingham Women's Football Club is an English women's football club.

History
In 1995, Gillingham F.C. owner Paul Scally co-opted a local women's football team called Borstal '88.

In June 2014, the team was brought back under the banner of the men's football club, Gillingham F.C., after a period as an independent outfit. Following this takeover, the club became known as Gillingham Ladies and played home games at Priestfield Stadium. Simon Ratcliffe was appointed as manager, but the club was relegated after the 2014–15 season and Ratcliffe subsequently departed.

In June 2020, Gillingham F.C. announced that, as a result of restructuring necessitated by the COVID-19 pandemic, they would no longer operate Gillingham Ladies with immediate effect. The club, sanctioned by the FA Women's National League, simultaneously announced a rebrand as Gillingham Women and would continue competing as an independent entity.

In October 2022 Kevin Hake, the manager-chairman of Chatham Town, was announced as owner-chairman of the side, succeeding Josh Oatham.

Players

Current squad
.

References

External links
 Official website

Women's football clubs in England
Ladies
Sport in Medway
Football clubs in Kent
Association football clubs established in 1995
1995 establishments in England
FA Women's National League teams